"Brazen (Weep)" is the fourth and final single from British rock band Skunk Anansie's second album, Stoosh (1996). It was released on 2 June 1997 and reached number 11 on the UK Singles Chart, making the song the band's most successful hit in their home country. In Iceland, it peaked at number one, ending 1997 as the year's third-most-successful single. Three versions of the single were released; CD2 and CD3 are remix CDs.

Music video
The video was directed by Thomas Krygier, who directed the video for "Hedonism". The video shows the band becoming attacked in a red room (hinted to be a mental hospital). The video ends with Skin waking up in a street, implying that it was a dream after she presumably fell on the ground unconscious or run over by a car, but with no injuries.

Track listing

CD single – CD1

CD single – CD2

CD single – CD3

Charts

Weekly charts

Year-end charts

References

1996 songs
1997 singles
Number-one singles in Iceland
One Little Indian Records singles
Rock ballads
Skunk Anansie songs
Song recordings produced by Garth Richardson
Songs written by Skin (musician)